Joseph Vaezian was an Iranian Armenian film producer and director.

Biography 
Vaezian was born in 1918 in the city of Kermanshah. He was a businessman before turning to cinema. Having an interest in art, he co-founded, with Aramais Aghamalian, Arman, and Samuel Khachikian, the Armenian Troup Theater in 1947. Ten years later he set up «Azhir Film Studio» with Khachikian and Shahrokh Rafie and started a new career as film producer. Storm in Our Town (Khachikian, 1958), produced by him and Rafi'e, was the first of 15 films he produced up to 1967. In the mid 1960s, he left Azhir Film to try his hands in other capacities, and wrote and directed The Wandering Man (1966) which was followed only by two films: Desperados and Fighting the Devil. Vaezian died in 2001, in Tehran.

Filmography

 As a producer

 1964 The Devil Is Knocking 
 1964 The Strike 
 1963 Victim of Sinful Desire 
 1962 Anxiety 
 1962 A Girl Is Screaming 
 1961 One Step to Death 
 1961 The Neighborhood Kids 
 1960 Lovers' Spring 
 1959 The Hill of Love 
 1959 In Search of a Groom 
 1958 A Messenger from Heaven

 As a director 
 1968 Az-jangozashtegan

References

External links

Iranian film directors
Iranian film producers
Persian-language film directors
People from Kermanshah
Iranian people of Armenian descent
1918 births
2001 deaths